Jonathan Livingston Seagull is the soundtrack album to the 1973 American film Jonathan Livingston Seagull, recorded by singer-songwriter Neil Diamond and produced by Tom Catalano. The album was released on Columbia Records, and grossed more than the film itself. It was Diamond's ninth studio album, and his first album after his successful 1972 live album Hot August Night. It won the 1974 Grammy as Best Original Score Written for a Motion Picture or a Television Special.

Track listing

Charts and certifications
Neil Diamond's previous album "Serenade" and "Jonathan Livingston Seagull" have earned combined 27 gold discs in Australia.
As of September 1976, the soundtrack was bigger success than the movie and it grossed 12 million dollars (movie grossed 2 million dollars)

Weekly charts

Year-end charts

Sales and certifications

Personnel
Produced by Tom Catalano
Engineered by Armin Steiner
Executive Art Director: Ron Coro
Art Direction and Design: David Larkham, Michael Ross
Album Design and Photography: Ed Caraeff
Inside Cover Portrait Photo by Tom Burke

Orchestra
Arranged and Conducted by Lee Holdridge
Musicians: Paulo Alencar, Phil Azelton, Israel Baker, Marilyn H. Baker, Paul Beaver, Myer Bello, Arnold Belnick, Richard Bennett, Dixie Blackstone, Hal Blaine, Harry Bluestone, Samuel Boghossian, Hoyt Bohannon, Owen Wilson Brady, Larry E. Carlton, Donald Christlieb, Gene Cipriano, Gary L. Coleman, Chase Craig, William Criss, Rollice Dale, Isabelle Dashkoff, Vincent N. DeRosa, Assa Drori, Robert Dubow, David A. Duke, Jesse Ehrlich, John Ellis, Gene P. Estes, Victor S. Feldman, Henry Ferber, Ronald P. Folsom, Norman Forrest, James Getzoff, Caesar Giovannini, Philip Goldberg, Harris Goldman, Emory L. Gordy Jr., Ralph E. Grierson, Allan Harshman, William Henderson, Thomas R. Hensley, Arthur Hoberman, Claire Hodgkins, Luella Howard, Selene Hurford, Harry Hyams, Jules Jacob, John T. Johnson, Yukiko Kanei, George Kast, Pearl Kaufman, Richard S. Kaufman, Raymond J. Kelley, Jerome A. Kessler, Louis Kievman, Lou Klass, Robert Konrad, Jacob Krachmalnick, Raphael Kramer, Bernard Kundell, William Kurasch, Carl LaMagna, Michael Lang, Diana Lee, Gayle Levant, Marvin Limonick, Abe Luboff, Arthur Maebe, Leonard Malarsky, Jack Marsh, Lew McCreary, Ida Sue McCune, Peter A. Mercurio, Joseph Mondragon, Milton E. Nadel, Wilbert Nuttycombe, Michael S. Omartian, Joe Osborn, Robert Ostrowsky, William B. Peterson, Hugo Raimondi, Sven Reher, Joseph Reilich, David B. Roberts, Nathan Ross, Johnny Rotella, Sheldon Sanov, Ralph Schaeffer, Gordon Schoneberg, David Schwartz, Sidney Sharp, Stan Sheldone, Thomas N. Shepard, Ray Siegel, Henry Sigismonti, Louis Singer, Arthur C. Smith, Clark E. Spangler, Julian Spear, Sally Stevens, Dennis St. John, Robert K. Stone, Anthony Terran, Joseph DiTullio, John DeVoogdt, Jackie Ward, Andra Willis, Tibor Zelig
Bob Mitchell's Singing Boys
Burbank Staff
Will Abar - stage man
Jim Atherton - stage man
Donn Fallenbuchel - electrician
Andy MacDonald - recorder
Bill Gernand - recorder
Bill Lambert - maintenance
Tom Beckert - maintenance
Richard Hayden - projectionist
Jim Winfree - record recording administrator
Doc Siegel - mixer

References

Neil Diamond soundtracks
Drama film soundtracks
1973 soundtrack albums
Columbia Records soundtracks
CBS Records soundtracks
Albums arranged by Lee Holdridge
Albums conducted by Lee Holdridge
Albums produced by Tom Catalano